State Route 419 (SR 419), also known as Pigeon Ridge Road, is a 4.0 mile long north-south state highway in Cumberland County, Tennessee. It serves as the primary road in and out of Cumberland Mountain State Park. Even though it is signed north-south, SR 419 primarily goes in an east-west direction.

Route description
SR 419 begins in the Cumberland Homesteads community at an intersection with US 127/SR 28. It immediately enters Cumberland Mountain State Park and winds its way west through the park, crossing atop the Byrd Creek Dam along the way. The highway then leaves the park and winds its way west through farmland and rural areas to come to an end just south of Crossville at an intersection with SR 101. The entire route of SR 419 is a two-lane highway and lies atop the Cumberland Plateau.

Major intersections

References

419
Transportation in Cumberland County, Tennessee